The Canton of Corbie  is a canton situated in the department of the Somme and in the Hauts-de-France region of northern France.

Geography 
The canton is organised around the commune of Corbie.

Composition
At the French canton reorganisation which came into effect in March 2015, the canton was expanded from 23 to 40 communes:

Baizieux
Bavelincourt
Beaucourt-sur-l'Hallue
Béhencourt
Bonnay
Bresle
Cerisy
Chipilly
Contay
Corbie
Fouilloy
Franvillers
Fréchencourt
Le Hamel
Hamelet
Heilly
Hénencourt
Lahoussoye
Lamotte-Warfusée
Marcelcave
Méricourt-l'Abbé
Mirvaux
Molliens-au-Bois
Montigny-sur-l'Hallue
Morcourt
Naours
Pierregot
Pont-Noyelles
Ribemont-sur-Ancre
Rubempré
Sailly-Laurette
Sailly-le-Sec
Talmas
Treux
Vadencourt
Vaire-sous-Corbie
Vaux-sur-Somme
La Vicogne
Wargnies
Warloy-Baillon

Population

See also
 Arrondissements of the Somme department
 Cantons of the Somme department
 Communes of the Somme department

References

Corbie